Chayanisa Chomchuendee (formerly known as Sukanya Chomchuendee; born 9 September 1988 in Surin) is a Thai pole vaulter.

Her personal bests of 4.30 metres outdoors (2018) and 3.70 metres indoors (2009) are current national records.

International Competitions

National Competition

References

1988 births
Living people
Chayanisa Chomchuendee
Female pole vaulters
Chayanisa Chomchuendee
Athletes (track and field) at the 2010 Asian Games
Athletes (track and field) at the 2014 Asian Games
Athletes (track and field) at the 2018 Asian Games
Chayanisa Chomchuendee
Medalists at the 2018 Asian Games
Asian Games medalists in athletics (track and field)
Southeast Asian Games medalists in athletics
Chayanisa Chomchuendee
Chayanisa Chomchuendee
Competitors at the 2009 Southeast Asian Games
Competitors at the 2011 Southeast Asian Games
Competitors at the 2013 Southeast Asian Games
Competitors at the 2015 Southeast Asian Games
Competitors at the 2017 Southeast Asian Games
Competitors at the 2019 Southeast Asian Games
Chayanisa Chomchuendee
Chayanisa Chomchuendee
Chayanisa Chomchuendee